Lester B. Pearson High School is an English language secondary school located in Montreal North, a borough of Montreal, Quebec, Canada. It is part of the English Montreal School Board. It was established in 1976. The Canadian student press, Learning for a Cause, was founded here in 2004. The school is also known for its unique student-athlete academic program.

Prior to 1998, it was operated by the Montreal Catholic School Commission.

References

External links

Lester B.Pearson High School Home Page
Lester B.Pearson High School Home Page (Archive)

English-language schools in Quebec
High schools in Montreal
English Montreal School Board
Montréal-Nord
Educational institutions established in 1976
1976 establishments in Quebec